Old Town (or Oldtown) is a former unincorporated community in North Carolina, which was annexed by Winston-Salem. It was located near Bethania, Tobaccoville, and Pfafftown along NC 67.

Today 
Today the name now refers to a neighborhood that occupies the former unincorporated community limits.

Development 
The Old Town Center which is a shopping center that opened in the second quarter of the 1960s has had an increase of development over the years. Retail Chains in the shopping center includes Dollar General, Food Lion, Badcock Home Furniture, and Boost Mobile. Restaurants include Little Caesars and the Camino Real Mexican Restaurant. Other non-local establishments are also featured at the shopping center. Oldtown Park and its Neighborhood Center is south of the neighborhood towards Pfafftown. Other restaurants and retail stores outside of the neighborhood include Harris Teeter, Lowes Foods, Walgreens, Bojangles, Biscuitville, McDonald's,  Wendy's, Panera Bread, Taco Bell, Dunkin', and among others.
 

Annexed places in North Carolina
Geography of Forsyth County, North Carolina
Geography of Winston-Salem, North Carolina
Former populated places in North Carolina